Hoplolaimus pararobustus is a plant pathogenic nematode.

References

External links 
 Nemaplex, University of California - Hoplolaimus pararobustus

Tylenchida
Plant pathogenic nematodes